Monaghan Road railway station was on the Dundalk and Enniskillen Railway in the Republic of Ireland.

The Dundalk and Enniskillen Railway opened the station on 1 October 1855.

It closed on 1 October 1957.

Routes

References

Disused railway stations in County Monaghan
Railway stations opened in 1855
Railway stations closed in 1957
1855 establishments in Ireland
Railway stations in the Republic of Ireland opened in the 19th century